Vanessa Webb (born 24 January 1976) is a Canadian former professional tennis player. She is currently the Player Class Director for the WTA Board of Directors.

In her career, she won ten singles and 25 doubles titles on the ITF Circuit. She also reached one WTA Tour doubles final, in Kuala Lumpur in 2000.

College
While at Duke, she won the Honda Sports Award as the nation's best female tennis player in 1999.

Tennis career
Webb made the second round of the 2003 Australian Open which was her best Grand Slam singles performance. She also reached the first round of the French Open (in 2003) and the US Open (in 1998 & 2000). In doubles, she made the second rounds of the French Open (in 2001,'02,'03 & '04) and the Wimbledon Championships (in 2003). Webb made the first rounds of the Australian Open (in 2000,'03) and US Open (in 1999, 2000), and also the first round of mixed-doubles at the Wimbledon Championships in 2003.

Personal life
After retiring from tennis, Webb has had a successful career with the Parthenon Group, a Boston-based consulting firm, working out of their branch in Mumbai, India, where she currently resides.

WTA career finals

Doubles: 1 (runner-up)

ITF Circuit finals

Singles: 16 (10–6)

Doubles: 37 (25–12)

References

External links
 

Living people
1976 births
Tennis players from Toronto
Canadian female tennis players
Olympic tennis players of Canada
Tennis players at the 2000 Summer Olympics
Canadian expatriates in India
Duke Blue Devils women's tennis players